Benoit is an unincorporated community in Runnels County, Texas, United States.

Notes

Unincorporated communities in Runnels County, Texas
Unincorporated communities in Texas